We're Going Separate Ways (Naši se putovi razilaze) is a Croatian World War II melodrama directed by Šime Šimatović. It was released in 1957 and preserved by Croatian national archive. The film was seen as perpetuating socialist realist ideology in Yugoslavia, and fared badly with both critics and audiences. The film was  exported to East Germany, Czechoslovakia, Hungary and the United States.

Plot summary
The film is set during World War II in Zagreb. Partisan Vjera Dogan (Saša Novak) breaks up with fellow activist Mirko (Bata Grbić). She admits to him she has fallen in love with Vilko Klančar (Boris Hržić), impressed with the way he withstood torture at a police interrogation. However, Vilko has actually turned informant, and Vjera's poor judgment will affect the destinies of people around her.

Cast
 Bata Grbić as Mirko
 Saša Novak as Vjera Dogan
 Boris Hržić as Vilko Klančar
 Miloš Jeknić as Spinach
 Joža Gregorin as Inspector Maraš
 Rudolf Kukić as Alojzije Žganjer
 Mira Nikolić as Nada
 Milan Milošević as Goran Koren
 Adam Vedernjak as Davor Vuković
 Viktor Bek as the doctor
 Krunoslava Ebrić Frlić as the landlady
 Tanja Kraus as the chemist

References

External links
 

1957 films
Croatian war drama films
1950s Croatian-language films
Jadran Film films
Films set in Zagreb
Croatian World War II films
Yugoslav war drama films
1957 drama films
Yugoslav World War II films